Hoag is an unincorporated community in Gage County, Nebraska, United States.

History
Hoag was named for one Mr. Hoagland, the original owner of the town site.  Hoag was the first station on the railroad out of Beatrice.

Hoag had a post office between 1885 and 1934.

References

Unincorporated communities in Gage County, Nebraska
Unincorporated communities in Nebraska